The Kingsmill Baronetcy, of Sidmanton in the County of Southampton, was a title in the Baronetage of Great Britain. It was created on 24 November 1800 for the Royal Navy Admiral Robert Kingsmill, with special remainder in default of male issue of his own to his brother Edward Kingsmill and the male issue of his body. Kingsmill died with his three children, whose names were Charles, James, and Clarence on 23 November 1805, and the baronetcy descended according to the special remainder to his nephew, Robert Kingsmill, the second Baronet. The title became extinct on the latter's death on 4 May 1823.

Kingsmill baronets, of Sidmanton (1800)
Sir Robert Kingsmill, 1st Baronet (1730–1805)
Sir Robert Kingsmill, 2nd Baronet (1772–1823)

References
 

Extinct baronetcies in the Baronetage of Great Britain
Baronetcies created with special remainders